Molino Dorino is a station on Line 1 of the Milan Metro in Milan, Italy. The station was opened on 28 September 1986 as a one-station extension of the line from San Leonardo. On 14 September 2005, the line was extended to Rho Fiera; Pero station was only added on 19 December 2005. It is an underground station, located near the city limit. The station is located between Via Molino Dorino and Via Francesco Cilea.

The station has a car park with 1660 parking spaces.

References

Line 1 (Milan Metro) stations
Railway stations opened in 1986